Niphanda asialis or White-banded Pierrot is a butterfly in the family Lycaenidae. It was described by Lionel de Nicéville in 1895. It is found in the Indomalayan realm.

Subspecies
 Niphanda asialis asialis (Sumatra, possibly Nias)
 Niphanda asialis cyme Fruhstorfer, 1919 (Java)
 Niphanda asialis marcia (Fawcett, 1904) (India to Peninsular Malaysia, southern Yunnan)
 Niphanda asialis onoma Fruhstorfer, 1919 (Sumatra)

References

External links
Niphanda at Markku Savela's Lepidoptera and Some Other Life Forms

Niphanda
Butterflies described in 1895